Eslamabad-e Do (also Romanized as Eslāmābād-e Do; also known as Eslāmābād) is a village in Kut-e Abdollah Rural District, in the Central District of Karun County, Khuzestan Province, Iran. At the 2006 census, its population was 376, in 68 families.

References 

Populated places in Karun County